Barbara Whiting Smith (May 19, 1931 – June 9, 2004) was an American actress and singer.

Early life 
Whiting was born in Los Angeles, California, the daughter of music manager Eleanor Youngblood Whiting and composer Richard A. Whiting. Her older sister was singer Margaret Whiting.

Career
Her movie career began with the 1945 film, Junior Miss, a movie based on her popular radio show by the same name. This was followed by nine other starring roles until she married Gail Smith and retired.

On television, she co-starred with her sister, Margaret in Those Whiting Girls on CBS. The program debuted July 4, 1955, as a summer replacement for I Love Lucy.

Whiting's radio career was what she was most known for during her lifetime. In 1948 she began to star in CBS's Junior Miss. It was one of the most successful radio shows of the time especially with younger audiences.

On February 8, 1960, Barbara was honored with a star at 6443 Hollywood Boulevard, in the television section of the Hollywood Walk of Fame.

Personal life and death
On May 7, 1959, Whiting married Gail Smith, an advertising professional. It was her first marriage and his second. They had a son, Richard Whiting Smith.

Barbara was a "longtime volunteer" at St. Joseph Mercy Oakland Hospital, Pontiac, Michigan. She lived a quiet life, dedicated to her son Richard.

Whiting died of cancer, in Pontiac, Michigan, aged 73, June 9, 2004. She was survived by her sister and a son.

Filmography

Select film credits 
 Junior Miss (1945) - Fuffy Adams
 Centennial Summer (1946) - Susanna Rogers
 Home, Sweet Homicide (1946) - Jo-Ella Holbrook
 Carnival in Costa Rica (1947) - Maria Molina
 City Across the River (1949) - Annie Kane
 I Can Get It for You Wholesale (1951) - Ellen Cooper
 Beware, My Lovely (1952) - Ruth Williams
 Rainbow 'Round My Shoulder (1952) - Suzy Milligan
 Dangerous When Wet (1953) - Suzie Higgins
 Paris Follies of 1956 (1955) (with sister Margaret Whiting) - Barbara Walton

Select television appearances 
 The Ed Sullivan Show
 Starlight Theatre (1950)
 The Bigelow Theatre (1951)
 Dragnet (1954)
 The Public Defender (1954) - Elly Black / Torry
 Those Whiting Girls - Desilu Studios (1955-1957) (TV serial)
 Fireside Theatre (1955) - Marian
 The Jimmy Durante Show (1955) - Herself - Suzy the Hatcheck Girl
 TV Reader's Digest (1956) - Birdie
 The Tennessee Ernie Ford Show (1956) - Herself - Singer
 Men of Annapolis (1957) - Willie (Wilhelmina)

Select radio credits 
 Hollywood Star Time
 Meet Corliss Archer
 The Screen Guild Theater
 The Great Gildersleeve
 Family Theater
 The Bing Crosby Show
 Escape
 The Railroad Hour
 Suspense
 Broadway Is My Beat
 On Stage
 Yours Truly, Johnny Dollar

References

External links 
 Short Biography
 
 

1931 births
2004 deaths
20th-century American actresses
20th-century American singers
20th-century American women singers
American film actresses
American radio actresses
American television actresses
Deaths from cancer in Michigan
Actresses from Los Angeles
21st-century American women